North Zhonghe Road is a metro station on Line 2 of the Hangzhou Metro in China. It is located in the Xiacheng District of Hangzhou.

Gallery

References

Railway stations in Zhejiang
Railway stations in China opened in 2017
Hangzhou Metro stations